Ghana International School is a coeducational international school located at Cantonment, Accra Ghana. Ghana International School has an enrollment of diverse backgrounds. The student population derives from many countries and cultural orientations.

History
It was established in 1955. It celebrated its 60th anniversary on 18 September in 2015.

Legal Structure
Ghana International School is a company limited by guarantee.

Academics
GIS uses international curriculum and their students sit for international examinations like. IGCSE GCE O-Level and GCE A-level. It is a day only mixed educational facility in Ghana delivering English National Curriculum. GIS is accredited by the Council of International Schools and the New England Association of Schools and Colleges. The school operates four departments – an infant, junior and lower/upper secondary schools. It has 20 different academic subjects. GIS accepts enrollment from ages 3 to 13.  Students in the Upper Secondary School adopt the Cambridge International Examinations' IGCSE and GCE A-level curricula.

Administration
It is governed by a Board of Directors. The Board draws membership from general industry experts from the public and private sectors. Academic affairs are overseen by a Principal who is assisted in management by an 8-member Team and in curriculum instruction by a corps of tutors.

Facilities
Facilities include a language laboratory, a film studio, electronic boards for teaching and several science laboratories.

Extracurricular activities

Major events for the school include UN Day to celebrate the diversity; cultural activities of drumming, dancing, folklore;  a 40-year traditional 13 km sponsored walk by the PTA; an art week portraying student creativity; a  musical show that features top performers and a  Science/Maths/ICT Fair that is held every two years to inspire research and scholastic excellence. The school is also a member of the International School Sports Association of Ghana and has participated in numerous sports competitions for football, basketball, hockey and more.

GIS Alumni
The school has an alumni association called Ghana International School Alumni (GISA). The Alumni provides regular counselling and mentorship sessions for the students, These sessions are usually held during the temporary subject, counselling.

Media mention
GIS activities receive press attention. In March 2014, myjoyonline.com, a news service for Multimedia Ghana Ltd, featured a news item on the school's musical show at the National Theater, and in October 2014, the Ghana News Agency, a state media outlet,  published a story on the UN Day held at the school.

In 2019, Elise Jensen, a student of Ghana International School put the flag of Ghana high on the international literacy stage.  Elise was one of more than 11,000 students from almost all the 53 commonwealth countries who submitted essays to the Queen’s Commonwealth Essay Competition Prize. Founded in 1883, The Queen’s Commonwealth Essay Competition is, therefore, the world’s oldest international writing competition for schools. It was created to promote literacy, expression and creativity among young people throughout the Commonwealth (General News of Friday, 1 November 2019).

References

External links

 
 Ghana Schools
 Expat Arrivals
 IS Village
 AISA
 Business Ghana
 Teacher Horizons
 Ghanaweb
 Kurasa
yaschools

Schools in Accra
High schools and secondary schools in Ghana
International schools in Ghana
Cambridge schools in Ghana
Educational institutions established in 1955
1955 establishments in Gold Coast (British colony)